Hjalmar Christensen (5 May 1869 – 29 December 1925) was a Norwegian writer and  a prominent literary critic.

Biography
Christensen was born at Sunnfjord in Sogn og Fjordane, Norway. He was raised on a farm in the community of Førde. He was the son of Michael Sundt Tuchsen Christensen (1827–95) and Frederikke Sophie Elster (1838–1927). His brother Ingolf Elster Christensen served as a government official and a member of the Storting.

He attended Bergen Cathedral School. He studied law and received a legal degree at the Royal Frederick University (now University of Oslo) in 1892. From 1893 to 1898, Christensen was an instructor at the Christiania Theater and lectured for several years at the Bergen Museum. In 1898, the post as professor of literary history at the Royal Frederick University had become vacant. Christensen applied for the post which went to Gerhard Gran. He subsequently studied classical philology and history and in 1902 was awarded his Dr. philos.

Christensen wrote a number of articles in magazines, weeklies, and newspapers. He also wrote thirty-two books, many featuring communities in Sunnfjord. Christensen published a number of novels with cultural history content. His most noted book Fogedgården, Af en bygds historie (1911) featured a culture description of life in Førde.

Selected works
Det retfærdige spil (1900)
Vort litterære liv (1902)
Danske digtere i nutiden (1904)
Unge aa (1905)
Et liv (1909) 
Fogedgården (1911)
Brødrene (1911)
Den gamle bygd (1913)
Din egen herre (1913)
Den nye bygd (1914)
Far og søn (1915)
Den hvide races selvmord (1916)
Tuntræet (1917) 
Dæmring (1918)
Professor Marga (1920)
Klostret paa Undrum (1924)

References

Other sources
 
Jorgenson, Theodore (1939) History of Norwegian Literature (Haskell House Publishing)

External links 
Digitized books by Christensen in the National Library of Norway

1869 births
1925 deaths
People from Sunnfjord
People educated at the Bergen Cathedral School
University of Oslo  alumni
Norwegian writers
Norwegian literary critics